The Latvia national handball team is the national handball team of Latvia and is controlled by the Latvian Handball Federation. It has competed since 1993, playing its opening match in the 1994 European Championship qualifiers against Cyprus on 15 April 1993 in Nicosia, winning 32:28. 

In 2019 the team qualified for the 2020 European Championships for the first time in their history, previously reaching the qualification play-off stage in 2005. The team has not yet qualified for neither the Olympic Games nor World Championships, with their best results so far being participation in the world qualifiers play-offs in 2004 and 2016. 

To this date Andris Gulbis has had the longest stint managing the team, working in 1998 and from 2005 to 2010. From 2017 til the end of Euro 2020 the team was  managed by former player Armands Uščins. The current head coach is Sandris Veršakovs.

Tournament record

European Championship
2020 – 24th place

IHF Emerging Nations Championship
2015 – 1st place

Team

Current squad
Squad for the 2020 European Men's Handball Championship.

Head coach: Armands Uščins

Notable players
Aivis Jurdžs
Evars Klešniks
Dainis Krištopāns
Ēriks Velde – a member of the 1964 World Men's Handball Championship All-Star Team

References

External links

IHF profile

Men's national handball teams
Handball